Łopuszna  is a village in the administrative district of Gmina Nowy Targ, within Nowy Targ County, Lesser Poland Voivodeship, in southern Poland. The village, with the population of about 1,300 lies on the Dunajec river, at the foot of the Gorce Mountains.

Łopuszna is the location of the Dwór Tetmajerów manor house built around 1790 (pictured); which serves as branch of the Tatra Muzeum in Zakopane since 1978.

References

Villages in Nowy Targ County